Terziler can refer to:

 Terziler, Aydın
 Terziler, Çanakkale